is a 2011 Japanese film directed by Hikaru Gotō.

Synopsis
Vampire Stories: Brother, is the first part of a two-part story that tells the fate of two brothers that are both descended from vampires.
When the university friends of Sei (Yanagishita Tomo) and Midori (Suzuki airi) are savagely killed, the sudden tragedy leaves them stunned. 
Sei's older brother Ai (Kato Kazuki) then reappears after having gone missing five years earlier. He reveals to a confused Sei the shocking truth behind the murders, and of the destiny they must shoulder together as brothers: Ai tells Sei that he, like Ai, is a pure blood vampire and that he will turn at the age of 20. Sei has to choose to live or die and what lies in middle of his decision is his younger step sister, Midori, whom he cares for. 
What will Sei choose? Midori, his younger step-sister or Ai, his older vampire brother? To live or to die?

Cast
 Tomo Yanagishita
 Tetsuya Makita
 Takako Hasuna
 Toru Baba
 Airi Suzuki

Japanese metal band Versailles provided the theme, "Vampire", from their third album Holy Grail. Their vocalist Kamijo was also in charge as a music producer.

References

External links
 

2011 directorial debut films
2011 films
Films directed by Hikaru Gotō
Japanese action films
Japanese fantasy films
Japanese romance films
Japanese vampire films
2010s Japanese films